Alexander Gaden (February 20, 1872, Newfoundland  - January 14, 1958 Cook County, Chicago) was a Canadian silent film actor. He starred in 32 films between 1912 and 1923. He was often seen in early efforts by Adolph Zukor's fledgling Famous Players Film Company. He was often quoted as being born on February 20, 1880, in Montreal, Quebec. He is buried in Wunder's Cemetery at Chicago, Cook County, Illinois.

Selected filmography
Leah Kleschna (1913)
The Daughter of the Hills (1913)
A Lady of Quality (1913)
An American Citizen (1914)
 The Capitol (1919) 
 The Bandbox (1919)
White Oak (1921)

References

External links

 

Canadian male film actors
Canadian male silent film actors
Male actors from Montreal
1872 births
1958 deaths
20th-century Canadian male actors